Paul Fleetford Sise (November 10, 1879 – August 1, 1951) Canadian businessman, President of Northern Electric (Nortel 1919 - 1948).  graduated from McGill University in 1901 and was an adjutant to the 148th Battalion, CEF, from Montreal.

See also
 Charles Fleetford Sise Sr.
 Charles Fleetford Sise Jr. (brother)
 Edward Fleetford Sise (brother)

References

External links
 The Sise Family and the Bell Telephone Company of Canada

1879 births
1951 deaths
Nortel people
McGill University alumni